Cottage Hill or Cottage Hills may refer to:

Cottage Hill, Indiana, an unincorporated community
Cottage Hills, Illinois, an unincorporated community
Cottage Hill, Ohio, an unincorporated community